Nong Phluang railway station is a railway station located in Nong Bua Sa-at Subdistrict, Bua Yai District, Nakhon Ratchasima Province.

References 

Railway stations in Thailand
Nakhon Ratchasima province